Storeria hidalgoensis, commonly known as the Mexican yellow-bellied brown snake or the Mexican yellowbelly brown snake, is a nonvenomous snake in the family Colubridae.  It is endemic to the Sierra Madre Oriental of Mexico.

Taxonomy
First considered a Mexican population of Storeria occipitomaculata by Storer in 1839, Storeria hidalgoensis was described as separate species in 1942 by Taylor. In 1944 it was reassigned as a subspecies of Storeria occipitomaculata by Trapido, and then in 1993 Flores-Villela reinstated it to full species rank, based partly on allopatry. Some feel that this re-evaluation to full species rank requires additional study.

The holotype of this species is deposited at the University of Illinois Museum of Natural History (Specimen no. 25061). It is a male collected by E.H. Taylor on 13 August 1938.

Geographic range

Description
Dorsal body color varies from gray to light brown, tan, reddish, or dark brown (grayish to dark brown in preservative) usually with small gray flecks but no dark spots or crossbands. Ventral coloring is either gray to pink, or may have dark gray pigment at least laterally. Its head is black, especially posteriorly, with small gray flecks. A dark wedge-shaped mark lies behind each parietal and a light spot is usually present within the mark. Labials are either gray, or contain variable amounts of dark pigment with the fifth supralabial being the lightest of the series. The dorsal scales are without pits with some faintly keeled.

Habitat
This is a terrestrial species that occurs in primary and secondary cloud forest, pine forest, pine-oak forest and fir forests.

Reproduction
Storeria hidalgoensis are viviparous.

Diet
The biology of these snakes is poorly known and further study has been recommended.

Etymology
The specific name, hidalgoensis, is composed of hidalgo-, which refers to the Mexican state in which the type specimen was collected, and the Latin suffix -ensis, which means "belonging to".

Bibliography
 Flores-Villela, O.A. 1993. Herpetofauna Mexicana: annotated list of the species of amphibians and reptiles of Mexico, recent taxonomic changes, and new species. Carnegie Mus. Nat. Hist. Spec. Publ. (17): iv + 73 pp, 2 figures, 1 table.

References

External links 
 Photo of Storeria hidalgoensis

Storeria
Snakes of North America
Fauna of the Sierra Madre Oriental
Endemic reptiles of Mexico
Reptiles described in 1942
Taxa named by Edward Harrison Taylor